Robert Sherman "Bob" Halperin (January 26, 1908 – May 8, 1985), nicknamed "Buck", was an American Star class sailor, and Olympic bronze medalist and Pan American Games gold medalist. He was also a college and National Football League (NFL) football quarterback, one of Chicago's most-decorated World War II heroes, co-founder of Lands' End, and chairman of Commercial Light Company.

Early and personal life
Halperin was born in Chicago, Illinois, and was Jewish. His father, Aaron, immigrated to the United States from Kiev in the 1890s, and died in 1964.  His mother, Julia, died in 1976.

He and his wife Margaret Stralka raised three sons, Thomas, Patrick and Daniel, the latter was Robert's biological son.  He lived in the Near North Side of Chicago, and Palm Springs, California.

Football career
In high school, he played football for Oak Park High School.  He was also captain of the football team.

In college, Halperin first played football for Notre Dame, as a quarterback under legendary coach Knute Rockne.  He then played football for the University of Wisconsin, from which he graduated in 1932.

After graduating college, in 1932 he played professional football as a quarterback for the Brooklyn Dodgers in the National Football League, under coach Benny Friedman.  He later coached football at St. Patrick High School.

Navy career

Halperin was one of Chicago`s most decorated sailors in World War II.

He joined the United States Navy on March 19, 1942, ultimately rising to the level of lieutenant commander. He trained first under boxer Gene Tunney, and then in a top-secret program in 1942 at Naval Amphibious Base Little Creek in Little Creek, Virginia, along with fellow NFL football players Phil Bucklew and John Tripson and seven others who made up the first class of what became known as the Navy Scouts & Raiders, a predecessor of the Navy Seals.  The three former NFL players were among 1,000 NFL players who served in the military for the U.S. during World War II.  The job of the trainees was to locate designated landing beaches at night for amphibious landings, note any obstacles, and guide the attacking troops and their landing craft.

War correspondent William H. Stoneman wrote of Halperin, "His job is to mark beaches for the assault, infantry, a daring, intricate job, calling for as much brain as courage, and barrels of both." He was in charge of 14 scout boats, the first to arrive in France in the Normandy landings. Halperin saw action in Sicily, Italy, Europe (including during D-Day), North Africa, and the Pacific.

He was decorated for gallantry with the Navy Cross, the Silver Star, and two Bronze Stars, as well as the highest honor of the Nationalist Chinese government.

In the North Africa invasion in November 1942, he sailed his scout ship from seven miles off-shore in complete darkness to French Morocco, located and marked landing beaches with landing signals, guided assault troops to their targets while being strafed by enemy planes, and became the first American in the invasion to capture two of the enemy when he personally captured two officers.  In recognition of his efforts, including his extraordinary heroism, skill, courage, and fearless devotion to duty, he received a presidential citation and the Navy Cross.

He was promoted to lieutenant commander for his actions in the assault on Scoglitti on the southeastern coast of Sicily in July–August 1943.

During the Normandy Invasion of the Cherbourg Peninsula, in June 1944 he guided the first two waves of assault troops to the assault beaches, against entrenched strong opposition, and saved two men from drowning. The Chicago Tribune notes he was "one of the first Americans to go ashore in France—perhaps, the first—on D-Day."  For his exceptionally meritorious performance of duty, and his "cool judgment and unusual ability", he was awarded a Bronze Star.

He was commanding officer of U.S. Naval Unit Six, from December 1944 to September 1945, in secret guerrilla action against the Japanese behind enemy lines in Fukien Province, China.  During that time, his team of Americans trained 2,500 Chinese guerrillas to fight the Japanese, planned and executed operations resulting in the killing of 1,300 enemy troops and the destruction of tons of their shipping, and he assisted in the rescue of 16 U.S. fliers.  While out-numbered and facing an enemy with superior equipment, he attacked the enemy with ambushes and in pitched battles, significantly depleting their forces.  He was located in Chongqing, Kunming, Camp 6, Hua'an, Zhangzhou, Gulangyu, and Shanghai.  He was granted a Gold Medal in lieu of a second Bronze Medal, for "distinguishing himself by exceptionally meritorious conduct.  For distinguishing himself "by gallantry and intrepidity", he was awarded a Silver Star.  In addition, the Nationalist Chinese government awarded him the Yun Hui "Cloud Banner", its highest honor.

Sailing career
Halperin, sailed for the Chicago Yacht Club and the Southern Lake Michigan Fleet.  He won the North American Star Championship in 1959.

He won a bronze medal for the United States in the Star class (mixed two-person keelboat) at the 1960 Summer Olympics in the Bay of Naples in Italy, at the age of 52, together with William Parks. Their yacht was the Shrew II.

In 1963, he won a gold medal along with Richard Stearns at the Pan American Games in Sao Paulo, Brazil, sailing the Ninotchka.

At the World Championships, the names of the crew whose yacht has the best total score are engraved on the Buck Halperin Trophy, named after him.

Halperin was inducted into the Chicagoland Sports Hall of Fame in 1989.

Business career
In business, Halperin became an executive of and rose to become Chairman of Commercial Light Company, a large electrical contractor and engineering business which his father had founded in 1915 and for which did electrical work in many Chicago buildings.  He became the company's President in 1959, and Chairman in the 1960s.  The company was involved in projects at the John Hancock Center, O'Hare International Airport, and Wrigley Field.

He also started the company Lands' End, in the Spring of 1963, with fellow sailor Richard Stearns, Halperin's close friend Gary Comer, and two of Stearns' employees.

Death
Halperin died May 8, 1985, in Palm Springs, California, at the age of 77. His body is at rest at Arlington National Cemetery with that of his wife.

See also
 List of Jews in sailing

References

External links
 Scouts and Raiders: the Navy's first special warfare commandos, John B. Dwyer, Praeger, 1993
 

1908 births
1985 deaths
Sportspeople from Chicago
Sportspeople from Palm Springs, California
Burials at Arlington National Cemetery
American male sailors (sport)
Sailors at the 1960 Summer Olympics – Star
Olympic bronze medalists for the United States in sailing
Pan American Games gold medalists for the United States
American chief executives
Notre Dame Fighting Irish football players
Wisconsin Badgers football players
Brooklyn Dodgers (NFL) players
United States Navy officers
Recipients of the Navy Cross (United States)
Recipients of the Silver Star
Jewish American sportspeople
American football quarterbacks
Players of American football from Illinois
20th-century American businesspeople
Medalists at the 1960 Summer Olympics
Pan American Games medalists in sailing
American people of Ukrainian-Jewish descent
Sailors at the 1963 Pan American Games
Medalists at the 1963 Pan American Games
United States Navy personnel of World War II
20th-century American Jews
Military personnel from California
Military personnel from Illinois